Sikhism in Indonesia is a small religious minority in Indonesia. There are about 10,000 to 15,000 Sikhs in Indonesia.

See also
H.S. Dillon
Gurnam Singh (runner)
 Jainism in Southeast Asia
 Hinduism in Southeast Asia

References

External links